Draupadi, also referred to as Krishnaa, Panchali, and Yajnaseni, is the main female protagonist of the Hindu epic Mahabharata, and the common consort of the five Pandava brothers—Yudhishthira, Bhima, Arjuna, Nakula, and Sahadeva. She is noted for her beauty, courage, and a rare polyandrous marriage.

In Mahabharata, Draupadi and her brother, Dhrishtadyumna, were born from a yajna (fire sacrifice) organized by King Drupada of Panchala. Arjuna won her hand in marriage, but she had to marry the five brothers because of her mother-in-law's misunderstanding. Later, she became an empress, as Yudhishthira performed the Rajasuya ritual and achieved the status of the emperor. She had five sons, one from each Pandava, who were collectively addressed as the Upapandavas.

The most notable incident in Draupadi's life is the game of dice at Hastinapura where Yudhishthira loses his possessions and wife, and she is humiliated by the Kaurava brothers and Karna. An attempt is made by Dushasana to disrobe her, but she is saved by the divine intervention of Krishna. Following the subsequent episodes, Draupadi and the Pandavas are exiled for 13 years. Significant events during this period include an attempted kidnapping by Jayadratha and the death of Kichaka. The exile is followed by the Kurukshetra War, where Draupadi loses her father, brothers, and her five children. After the war, she resumes her role as the empress for 36 years, after which she retires to the Himalayas, along with her husbands.

Draupadi's story has been an inspiration for various arts, performances and secondary literature. In Hinduism, she is extolled as one of the panchakanya (five virgins), archetypes of female chastity whose names are believed to dispel sin when recited. In some parts of the sub-continent, a sect of Draupadi exists, where she is worshipped as a goddess.

Etymology and epithets

The word Draupadī (lit. 'daughter of Drupada') is a patronymic, derived from the word Drupada, which means 'pillar'. Like other epic characters, she is referred to by multiple names in the Mahabharata. Some of her other names and epithets are as follows:

 Krishnaa (Kṛṣṇā) – 'one who has a dark complexion'. It is the birth name of Draupadi.
 Panchali (Pāñcālī) – 'one from Panchala'.
 Yajnaseni (Yajñasenī) – another patronymic derived from Drupada's another name Yajnasena (lit. 'he whose army is sacrificial'); or the name can also mean 'one born from a Yajña (sacrificial fire)'.
 Drupadakanya (Drupadakanyā) – 'the daughter of Drupada'.
 Sairandhri (Sairandhrī) – 'an expert maid'. This pseudonym was assumed by Draupadi during her incognito life.
 Parshati (Parṣatī) – 'granddaughter of Prishata', or 'daughter of Prishati'. Both the names—Parshati and Prishati—are derived from Prishata, Drupada's father.
 Nityayuvani (Nityayuvanī) – 'one who remains young forever and never becomes old'.
Mahabharati – the virtuous wife of great descendants of Bharata (Pandavas)
Agnijā – 'One born from the fire'
Kalyani – 'One who brings fortune'. Yudhishthira addressed her by this name.
 Malini (Mālinī) – fragrant, one who makes garlands.
 Panchavallabha (Pancavallabhā) – 'Beloved of the five Pandavas'.
 Pandusharmila (Pāṇḍuśarmilā) – 'Daughter-in-law of Pandu'.

Literary background
The story of Draupadi is told in the great indian script Mahabharata, one of the Sanskrit epics from the Indian subcontinent. The work is written in Classical Sanskrit and is a composite work of revisions, editing and interpolations over many centuries. The oldest parts in the surviving version of the text probably date to about 400 BCE.

The Mahabharata manuscripts exist in numerous versions, wherein the specifics and details of major characters and episodes vary, often significantly. Except for the sections containing the Bhagavad Gita which is remarkably consistent between the numerous manuscripts, the rest of the epic exists in many versions. The differences between the Northern and Southern recensions are particularly significant, with the Southern manuscripts more profuse and longer. Scholars have attempted to construct a critical edition, relying mostly on a study of the "Bombay" edition, the "Poona" edition, the "Calcutta" edition and the "south Indian" editions of the manuscripts. The most accepted version is one prepared by scholars led by Vishnu Sukthankar at the Bhandarkar Oriental Research Institute, preserved at Kyoto University, Cambridge University and various Indian universities.

Life and Legends

Birth

Most Hindu texts state that Draupadi was not born of a woman and thus, she is often described as an ayonija (lit. 'one not born from a woman's womb'). Her birth is narrated in the Adi Parva of the epic. Drona—the teacher of the Kuru princes—defeats Drupada with the help of his students, and takes half of Panchala. Drupada seeks vengeance but realises that none of his children and allies is capable enough to slay Drona. As a result, he decides to perform a yajna (fire-sacrifice) to obtain a powerful son. With the sages Yaja and Upyaja serving as the head priests, the yajna is conducted. After completion, the priests instruct Prishati—the wife of Drupada—to consume the sacrifice offering, but she refuses and asks them to wait till she washed herself. Unable to wait, Yaja pours the offering into the altar of the sacrifice, from which a youthful man and a woman emerge. The latter's birth is followed by a divine prophecy,  
The youth and the maiden are named Dhrishtadyumna and Krishnaa, but the latter one is better known by the patronymic "Draupadi". They accept Drupada and Prishati as their parents and are raised in Drupada's palace.

Draupadi is described to be extremely beautiful. Vyasa—the author of the Mahabharata—describes her having a dark complexion, lotus-like eyes, beautiful copper nails, dark curly hair and an enchanting fragrance like that of a blue lotus.

Mahabharata includes an exceedingly flattering description of Draupadi as she arose from the fire,

Marriage and children

Drupada intended to wed Draupadi to Arjuna, who had previously defeated him in a battle. Upon hearing of the Pandavas' supposed death at Varnavata, he set up a Swayamvara contest for Draupadi to choose her husband from the competitive contest. The test was to lift and string a bow, and fire arrows to pierce the eye of a golden fish only by looking at its reflection in the water. The news of Draupadi's svayamvara spread far and wide, and numerous princes, as well as the general public including brahmanas, began proceeding towards Panchala. It so happened that the Pandavas also began their journey toward Panchala at this time along with their mother, Kunti. As they were on their way toward Panchala they were met by a large group of brahmanas on their way to Panchala, who invited Pandavas to join them. At the Swayamvara, almost all the assorted monarchs were unable to complete the challenge. There are some variations regarding Karna's participation. Some renditions show Draupadi refusing to marry Karna on account of being a Suta, while some other versions describe him failing to string the bow by the "breadth of a hair".

In the end, Arjuna succeeds in the task, dressed as a Brahmin. The other attendees, including the Kauravas and Karna protest at a Brahmin winning the competition and attack Draupadi and Arjuna. Arjuna and Bhima together protect Draupadi by defeating all attendees and are able to retreat. Arjuna, along with Draupadi and his brothers, runs home to tell Kunti of his success, shouting "look what we have found". Kunti thought he was referring to alms found in the forest or to some great prize unknown to her. She tells Arjuna that the find must be shared with his brothers, as they had always shared such things in the past. This misunderstanding, combined with a motherly command, leads to an agreement that all five brothers marry her. This is one of the rare examples of polyandry in Sanskrit literature. The brothers agreed that none should intrude if Draupadi was alone with one of the others, the penalty for doing so being 12 years to be spent in exile. Some versions say that a year was allotted to each Pandava and during that year only that Pandava could enter Draupadi's private chambers, while the others have no such mention.

Later Draupadi becomes a mother of five sons, one son each from the Pandava brothers. They were known as Upapandavas. Their names were Prativindhya (from Yudhishthira), Sutasoma (from Bheema), Shrutakarma (from Arjuna), Satanika (from Nakula) and Shrutasena (from Sahadeva). Ashwatthama killed the Upapandavas during his surprise raid on Pandava camp on the eighteenth day of the war to avenge the death of his father Drona.

Draupadi as the empress

With the Pandavas' survival revealed, a succession crisis was started. Upon the news of Pandavas' death at Varnavrat, the title of 'the crown prince' had fallen to Duryodhana. Dhritrashtra invites the Pandavas to Hastinapur and proposes that the kingdom be divided. The Pandavas are assigned the wasteland Khandavprastha, referred to as unreclaimed desert. With the help of Krishna, Pandavas rebuilt Khandavprastha into the glorious Indraprastha. The crown jewel of the kingdom was built at the Khandava forest, where Draupadi resided in the "Palace of Illusions". Yudhishthira performed the Rajasuya Yagna with Draupadi by his side; the Pandavas gained lordship over many regions.

Draupadi was trained in economy and was responsible for the treasury of the Empire. Additionally, she also ran a citizen liaison. Her duties as a busy Empress are mentioned in her famous conversation with Satyabhama, Krishna's favourite wife, during their exile.

Duryodhana's insult
There is a popular myth that is believed to be the reason why Duryodhana hated Draupadi.
Duryodhana and his entourage were exploring the keep during their visit to Yudhishthira's Rajasuya Yagna. While touring the grounds, an unsuspecting Duryodhana fell prey to one of the many illusions that could be seen all around the palace. When he stepped on the apparently solid part of the courtyard, there was a splash and Duryodhana found himself waist-deep in water, drenched from head to foot by the hidden pool. The myth is, Draupadi and her maids saw this from the balcony with amusement, and joked Andhasya Putra Andhaha meaning 'a blind man's son is blind'. This famous story does not feature in Veda Vyasa's Mahabharatha but is the figment of the imagination of a much later playwright. It gained immense popularity gradually through repeated depictions in various screen and written adaptations of the epic across the length and breadth of the country. The most popular depictions were by B.R. Chopra's Mahabharata series that aired on Doordarshan in 1988 and famous Telugu film 'Daana Veera Soora Karna' starring Nandamuri Taraka Rama Rao as Duryodhana, where Draupadi's laughter was singled out for dramatic effect.

In Vyasa's Sanskrit epic, the scene is quite different. It was Bhima, Arjuna, and the twin brothers alongside their retinues who had witnessed Duryodhana's fall and laughed along with their servants. In the Sanskrit text, Draupadi is not mentioned in the scene at all, either laughing or insulting Duryodhana. Nonetheless, Duryodhana felt insulted by the behaviour of the four Pandavas, stoking his hatred of them. Later on, he went back to Hastinapur and expressed his immense agony on witnessing the riches of the Pandavas to his blind father, which was the root cause for inviting his cousins for the dice-game. His main wish was to usurp the wealth of his cousins which they had accumulated on account of the Rajasuya Yajna. Known to few, during this conversation, Duryodhan mentions how he had observed Draupadi serving food to everyone, including physically challenged citizens as the Empress. He says to his father,"And, O king, Yajnaseni, without having eaten herself, daily seeth whether everybody, including even the deformed and the dwarfs, hath eaten or not."

He then went on to express his wrath at having fallen into a pool of water and being laughed at mockingly, mainly by Bhima, followed by Arjun, Nakul, Sahadeva and other menials in the palace. It is here, where he fleetingly mentioned Draupadi's name, who accordingly to Duryodhan, had "joined in the laughter with other females." Whether Duryodhana was speaking an untruth or her name was a later addition into this part of the text is debatable.

Draupadi's laughter went on to be singled out and romanticized by writers for centuries as a cause for the dice-game, and the war. In Vyasa's Sanskrit epic, however, her role in the scene is trivial compared to the exaggerated treatment it has received in popular adaptations.

Game of dice and humiliation

This key incident is often considered to mark a definitive moment in the story of Mahabharata. It is one of the driving reasons that ultimately led to the Kurukshetra War.

Together with his maternal uncle Shakuni, Duryodhana conspired to call on the Pandavas to Hastinapur and win their kingdoms in a game of gambling. There is famous folklore that the plan's architect, Shakuni had magic dice that would never disobey his will, as they were made from the bones of Shakuni's father. This story, however, is non-existent in the Sanskrit epic. As the game proceeds, Yudhishthira loses everything at first. In the second round, Yudhishthira's brother Nakula is at stake, and Yudhishthira loses him. Yudhisthira subsequently gambles away Sahadeva, Arjuna and Bhima. Finally, Yudhishthira puts himself at stake, and loses again. For Duryodhana, the humiliation of the Pandavas was not complete. He prods Yudhishthira that he has not lost everything yet; Yudhishthira still has Draupadi with him and if he wishes he can win everything back by putting Draupadi at stake. Inebriated by the game, Yudhishthira, to the horror of everybody present, puts Draupadi up as a bet for the next round. Playing the next round, Shakuni wins. Draupadi was horrified after hearing that she was staked in the game and now is a slave for Duryodhana. Duryodhana initially sends his charioteer Pratikamin to bring Draupadi to the court. Pratikamin informs Draupadi about the incidents happened during the dice game. Draupadi questions Yudhishthira's right on her as he had lost himself first and she was still the queen.  Duryodhana, angry with Draupadi's questions, commands his younger brother Dushasana to bring her into the court, forcefully if he must.
Dushasana drags Draupadi to the court by the hair. Seeing this, Bhima pledges to cut off Dushasana's hands, as they touched Draupadi's hair. Now in an emotional appeal to the elders present in the forum, Draupadi repeatedly questions the legality of the right of Yudhishthira to place her at stake.

In order to provoke the Pandavas further, Duryodhana bares and pats his thigh looking into Draupadi's eyes, implying that she should sit on his thigh. The enraged Bhima vows in front of the entire assembly that he would break Duryodhana's thighs, or else accept being Duryodhana's slave for seven lifetimes. At this time Vikarna, a brother of Duryodhana asks the kings assembled in the court to answer the question of Draupadi. He gives his opinion that Draupadi is not won rightfully as Yudhishthira lost himself first before staking her. Besides, no one has the right to put a woman on bet according to shastras; not a husband, father, or even the gods. Hearing these words, Karna gets angry and says that when Yudhishthira lost all his possession he also lost Draupadi, even specifically staking her. Karna calls Draupadi a "whore" for being the wedded wife of five men, adding that her being to the court is not a surprising act whether she is clothed or naked. He then instructs Dushasana  to remove the garments of Draupadi. After her husbands fail to assist her, Draupadi prays to Krishna to protect her. Dushasana attempts to disrobe her, but she is miraculously protected by Krishna, and Dushasana finds that as he continues to unwrap the layers of her sari, the amount of fabric covering her never lessens. Dushasana is eventually reduced to exhaustion, as the awed court observes that Draupadi is still chastely dressed. At this point, a furious Bhima vows to drink blood from Dushasana's chest, at the pain of not seeing his ancestors/entering heaven. This vow unsettles the entire court.

The only Kauravas who object to the disrobing of Draupadi in the court are Vikarna and Yuyutsu. Vidura openly calls Duryodhana a snake and demon after finding no support even from his own brother, Vidura is helpless. Karna further orders Dushasana to take Draupadi to the servants' quarters and derisively asks her to choose another husband who unlike Yudhishthira would not gamble her away. Just then, jackals call out as a mark of evil omen. Queen Gandhari enters the scene and counsels Dhritarashtra to undo her sons' misdeeds. Fearing the ill-omens, Dhritarashtra intervenes and grants Draupadi a boon. Draupadi asks that her husband Yudishthira be freed from bondage so her son Prativindhya would not be called a slave. In order to pacify her further, Dhritarashtra offers a second boon. Calmly, she asks for the freedom of the Pandavas along with their weapons. When Dhritarashtra asks her for her third wish, she reminds him that a Kshatriya woman can seek only two wishes, three would be a sign of greed. Dhritarashtra gives them back their wealth and grants them permission to go home.

Amused by the sudden turn of events, Karna remarks that they "have never heard of such an act, performed by any of the women noted in this world for their beauty." He taunts the Pandavas by praising their wife, as she had rescued them "like a boat from their ocean of distress".

Having restored their pride and wealth, the Pandavas and Draupadi leave for Indraprastha, only to receive another invitation for a game of dice, in which the loser would be given an exile of 12 years followed by a year of Agyatavasa, meaning "living in incognito". Yudhishtira yet again accepts the invitation and loses, and goes on an exile with his brothers and wife Draupadi.

Living in Exile

Durvasa's visit

Once, Draupadi and the Pandavas had finished eating their meal cooked from the Akshay Patra. Suddenly, sage Durvasa and his pupils visited them. They were sent by Duryodhana as he wanted the sage to curse the Pandavas. The brothers welcomed the sage along with his pupils and offered them service. Durvasa demanded food to eat as he was hungry. However, Draupadi had nothing left to feed the guests. Frightened that the sage would curse them, Draupadi prayed to god. Krishna then came there and asked her to give him the vessel. Draupadi gave the vessel to Krishna and he ate a single grain of rice left in it. The sage and his pupils suddenly felt that they had eaten a grand feast and left the place with satisfaction. Though a very popular tale, the "Critical Edition" doesn't include this incident.

Abduction by Jayadratha

While the Pandavas was in the Kamyaka forest, they often went hunting, leaving Draupadi alone. At this time Jayadratha, the son of Vriddhakshatra and the husband of Duryodhana's sister Dussala, passed through Kamyaka forest on the way to Salva Desa. Jayadratha met Draupadi and then started beseeching her to go away with him and desert her husband. Draupadi pointed out the immorality of deserting one's spouses when they were in difficulty and attempted to stall and dissuade Jayadradtha by describing how the Pandavas would punish him. Failing with words, Jayadratha forced her onto his chariot. Meanwhile, the Pandavas finished their hunt and found Draupadi missing. Learning of their wife's abduction by Jayadratha they rushed to save her. On seeing the Pandavas coming after him, Jayadratha left Draupadi on the road, though ultimately the Pandavas managed to arrest him. Arjuna urged Bhima to spare Jayadratha's life for the sake of Dussala and Gandhari, much to the indignation of Draupadi. In some versions of the story, Yudhishthira asks Draupadi to pass the sentence since it was she who was attacked, and she begrudgingly counsels to spare him because of the relations they share. Before freeing him, the Pandavas shaved Jayadratha's head at five places in order to publicly humiliate him.

Agyatvās (Incognito)

On the thirteenth year of their exile, the Pandavas choose to stay in the Matsya Kingdom. Draupadi becomes the maid of Sudeshna, queen of Matsya, and serves her.
One day Kichaka, Sudeshna's brother and the commander of king Virata's forces, happens to see Draupadi. He is filled with lust by looking at her and requests her hand in marriage. Draupadi refuses him, saying that she is already married to Gandharvas. Seeing his persistence, she warns Kichaka that her husbands are very strong and that he will not be able to escape death at their hands. Later, he convinces his sister, the queen Sudeshna, to help him win Draupadi. Sudeshna orders Draupadi to fetch wine from Kichaka's house, overriding Draupadi's protests. When Draupadi goes to get wine, Kichaka tries to molest her. 

Draupadi escapes and runs into the court of Virata. Kichaka kicks her in front of all the courtiers, including Yudhishthira. Fearful of losing his most powerful warrior, even Virat does not take any action. Bhima is present, and only a look from Yudhishthira prevents him from attacking Kichaka. Furious, Draupadi asks about the duties of a king and dharma. She then curses Kichaka with death by her husband's hand. Laughing it off, Kichaka only doubts their whereabouts and asks those present where the Gandharvas are. Yudhishthira addresses Draupadi as Sairandhri and orders her to go to the temple, as Kichaka would not do anything to her there (in some versions, he recommends she seeks refuge with the queen). With this, the king asks Kichaka to leave and praises Yudhishthira's reply as he himself could not think of anything.

Later that night, Bhima consoles Draupadi, and they hatch a plan to kill Kichaka. Draupadi meets with Kichaka, pretending to actually love him and agreeing to marry him on the condition that none of his friends or brothers will know about their relationship. Kichaka accepts her condition. Draupadi asks Kichaka to come to the dancing hall at night. Bhima (in the guise of Draupadi), fights with Kichaka and kills him. 

Draupadi calls the members of Kichaka's family and shows them the mutilated body of Kichaka. The murder is attributed to her Gandharva husbands. This angers Kichaka's brothers and they decide to burn her along with Kichaka's body to take revenge. After getting permission from Virata, Draupadi is forcefully tried to Kichaka's pyre. Upon her pleading, Bhima runs for her help and kills the brothers of Kichaka, thus saving her from being burnt alive.

Kurukshetra War 
During the war, Draupadi stays at Ekachakra with other women. On the 16th day, Bhima kills Dushasana, drinking his blood and fulfilling his oath.

A popular myth, often depicted in well-known adaptations of Mahabharata, depicts Draupadi washing her hair with her brother-in-law Dushasana's blood, as a mark of her vengeance against the molestation she had suffered at the dice-game. Though an extremely powerful and symbolic theme, this incident does not appear in Vyasa's Sanskrit Mahabharata. 
Alf Hiltebeitel in his acclaimed research work, "The Cult of Draupadi" explores the source of this myth as he travels through the rural areas of India. He discovers that the first literary mention of the blood-washing theme appeared in "Venisamhara"
 or "Braiding The Hair (of Draupadi)", a Sanskrit play written in the Pallava period by eminent playwright Bhatta Narayana. Since then, this powerful theme of vengeance had been used in most retellings and adaptations on Mahabharat, thus mistakenly attributing the authorship to Veda Vyasa.

Ashwatthama's attack
Ashwathama, in order to avenge his father's as well as other Kuru warriors' deceitful killing by the Pandavas, attacks their camp at night with Kripacharya and Kritavarma. Ashwathama killed Dhrishtadyumna, Shikhandi, Upapandavas, and the remaining Pandava and Panchala army. In the morning, Yudhishthira hears the news and asks Nakula to bring Draupadi from Matsya Kingdom. Draupadi vows that if the Pandavas do not kill Ashwatthama, she would fast to death. The Pandavas find Ashwatthama at Vyasa's hut. Arjuna and Ashwatthama end up firing the Brahmashirsha astra at each other. Vyasa intervenes and asks the two warriors to withdraw the destructive weapon. Not endowed with the knowledge to do so, Ashwatthama instead redirects the weapon to Uttara's womb, but Krishna protects the Pandavas' only heir with his Sudarshana Chakra. Krishna curses him for this act. Ashwatthama is caught by the Pandavas and his jewel is taken away. Draupadi gives the jewel to Yudhishthira and forgives the killer of her children. Due to the power of meditation, her wrath is subdued and she speaks of Ashwathama, son of their preceptor Drona,

Later life and death

Draupadi and Yudhishthira performed the Ashvamedha and ruled for 36 years. When her husbands retired from the world and went on their journey towards the Himalayas and heaven, she accompanied them and was the first to fall dead on the journey. When Bhima asked Yudhishthira why Draupadi had fallen, Yudhishthira replied,

Polyandry 

Polyandry was not regarded without censure by the society spoken of in the epic. The Vedic texts have not discriminated between polyandry and polygamy but usually, the women of royal families were allowed to indulge in polyandry for expansion of progeny, although polygyny was more common among men of higher social ranks. Her marriage to five men was controversial for political reasons as that was an advantage for Prince Duryodhana to get the throne of Bharat Varsha. However, when questioned by Kunti to give an example of polyandry, Yudhishthira cites Gautam-clan Jatila (married to seven Saptarishi) and Hiranyaksha's sister Pracheti (married to ten brothers).

There are many women of high born classes or royal class like Princess Mādhavi who had 4 husbands, the only daughter of King Yayati. Polyandry was in the royal class but under the strict guidance of the Vedic sages exactly like polygamous marriages of ancient Indian kings were under strict supervision and guidance of the Vedic laws and Vedic sages.

Draupadi as a goddess

In Sanskrit Mahābhārata, Draupadi is described as the incarnation of different goddesses. In Sambhava section of Adi Parva, she is said to be partial incarnation of Goddess Shachi (or Sachi). However, in Vaivahika section of Adi Parva Vyasa describes her as the celestial Sri. In Svargarohanika Parva, Yudhisthira goes to heaven and sees Draupadi seated as Goddess Sri (Or Sree).

The Draupadi Amman sect (or Draupadi devotional sect) is a tradition that binds together a community of people in worshipping Draupadi Amman as a village goddess with unique rituals and mythology Fire walking or Thimithi is a popular ritual enacted at Draupadi Amman temples. At the ancient religious festival of Bengaluru Pete named Bangalore Karaga, Draupadi is worshipped as an incarnation of Adishakti and Parvati in the nine-day event.

There are over 400 temples dedicated to Draupadi in the Indian states of Andhra Pradesh, Tamil Nadu, Karnataka and other countries like Sri Lanka, Singapore, Malaysia, Mauritius, Réunion, South Africa. In these regions, Draupadi is worshipped mainly by people of the Konar (Yadavas), Vanniyar (Kshatriyas) and Mutaliyar caste.

There are a few processions and festivals which are conducted for about 3 weeks a year. The most famous festival is in the village Durgasamudram, Tirupati of Chittoor district.

As a village deity
The Draupadi Amman cult (or Draupadi sect) is a regional Hindu sect in which the Pillais, Pallis, Konar, and the Mutaliyar communities worship Draupadi Amman was main god of vanniyar  as a village goddess with unique rituals and mythologies.

Incarnation of Kali
The Pillais, Vanniyars, Mudaliyars, Konars and the Gounder community of Tamil Nadu, and the Tigala community of Karnataka believe Draupadi Amman as an incarnation of Adi Parashakti and as their household goddess (kuladevi) of their communities. There are many temples in South Indian villages dedicated to Draupadi Amman, observing annual festivals. One of the popular temples of Sri Dharmarayaswamy- Draupadi temple is at Thigarapete, the heart of Bengaluru, Karnataka. .

Fire Walking ritual

Fire walking or Thimithi is a popular ritual enacted at the Draupadi Amman temples.

Location 
There are a number of temples dedicated to Draupadi Amman in Tamil Nadu, Singapore and Sri Lanka.

In other traditions
In Buddhism, Kṛṣṇā Draupadī is presented in the Mahāvastu and the Lalitavistara as one among eight goddesses who reside in the western cardinal direction.

In Digambara Jain scriptures like Harivamsa Purana, polyandry of Draupadi has been rejected and it is suggested that she was married only to Arjuna. Hemachandra, a Svetambara Jain monk, accepts the polyandry in his work Triṣaṣṭi and further suggests that Draupadi was Nagasri in one of her previous lives and had poisoned a Jain monk. Therefore, she had to suffer in hell and animal incarnations for several lives before being born a woman who later became a Jain nun. After her death, she was reborn as Draupadi and was married to five Pandavas.

In popular culture

In Folk Cultures
 According to a folklore, Draupadi introduced the popular Indian snack Pani Puri.
Draupadi had only five sons in the Sanskrit epic. But, according to some folklores, the Pandavas and Draupadi had six daughters too. Based on several such tales, the names of their daughters are listed below:
Suthanu (from Yudhishthira) 
Samyukthana (from Bheema) 
Pragati and Pragya/Prathigya (twins) (from Arjuna)
Printha (from Nakula)
Sumithra (from Sahadeva).

Arts and dances
The story of Draupadi is one of the central topics of Yakshagana, a traditional dance-play practised in Karnataka and Terukkuttu, a Tamil street theatre form practised in Tamil Nadu state of India and Tamil-speaking regions of Sri Lanka.

List of popular performers

In films

In television

In literature
The fiery heroine of Mahabharata has been the topic of research and debate for centuries. There are various plays and novels based on her.

Yajnaseni by Pratibha Ray – This novel, originally written in Odia was the recipient of Jnanpith Award. It was also translated in various languages like English, Hindi, Bengali, Tamil, Malayalam, etc.
The Palace of Illusions: A Novel by Chitra Banerjee Divakaruni – Deviating much from the Sanskrit text, Divakaruni brings up the emotions of Draupadi, re-imagining the whole epic from her perspective.
 Draupadi by Yarlagadda Lakshmi Prasad, is a Sahitya Akademi Award-winning Telugu novel that narrates Mahabharata from Draupadi's perspective.
The Cult of Draupadi by Alf Hiltebeitel – This trilogy is an exhaustive, scholarly account of the various folk traditions surrounding Draupadi in South India. Hiltebeitel travels through various parts of India, tracing and recording the lesser-known customs and tribes in Gingi Cult and much more, who extensively worship Draupadi as their deity – a status which has been attained by few Mahabharat characters. There are over 31 plays and ballads that are conducted in over 400 temples, that are dedicated to Draupadi Amman. The story of Draupadi creates great respect for women in society. Her sacrifice and her inner power defeats the evil activities performed on women
Nathabati Anathbat by Shaoli Mitra – This is a stage play depicting the agony of Draupadi as a woman who "has five husbands, and yet none to protect her."
Dopdi by Mahasweta Devi in Bengali – A contemporary tale of oppression with Draupadi as the lead character.
The Great Indian Novel by Dr. Shashi Tharoor – Written as a fictional work that is analogous to the events featured in the Mahabharata in order to describe contemporary Indian Politics, Dr.Tharoor has described the character of 'Draupadi' as 'Di Mokrasi', who is an illegitimate daughter of 'Dhritarashtra' and 'Lady Drewpad' in the novel. Tharoor likens Draupadi to the tenets of 'Democracy'. As mentioned in Veda Vyasa's epic, he ascribes her to be the wife to all five 'Pandyas', who are themselves an abbreviation of different facets of Indian politics.

See also
 Agnivansha
 Draupati Amman
 Yajnaseni, a novel by Pratibha Ray
 Yajnaseni, a play by Suman Pokhrel
Historicity of the Mahabharata

Notes

References
 
 Eminent women in the Mahabharata by Vanamala Bhawalkar.

 
The Critical Edition of Mahabharat(1966) published by Bhandarkar Oriental Research Institute
 Mahabharata (1999) by Krishna Dharma
 Mahabharata of Krishna Dwaipayana Vyasa, English translation by Kisari Mohan Ganguli

External links 

 Sacred-texts.com
 The Kaurava race of Sri Lanka and the worship of Draupadi
 Karaga Worship is all about Goddess Draupadi
 
 Pattanaik, Devadutt (2009). 7 Secrets from Hindu Calendar Art. Westland, Mumbai. .
 Draupadi Amman Shrine/ Temple - KONDAL, Mayiladuthurai, TN. 
 Visit http://blog.thitherwards.com/draupadi/ for more details. 

Characters in the Mahabharata
Tamil deities
People related to Krishna
Indian female royalty